Gajisan may refer to:

 Gajisan (Ulsan/Gyeongsang), a mountain in South Korea
 Gajisan (South Jeolla), a mountain in South Korea